The Hoe Avenue peace meeting was an important gathering of New York City gangs on December 8, 1971, in the Bronx. It was called to propose a general truce and an unprecedented inter-gang alliance. The impetus for the meeting was the murder of "Black Benjie", a peace keeper of the Ghetto Brothers. While no lasting peace was ever established, a subsequent negotiation established a procedure for dealing with conflicts to avoid street warfare. The meeting is notable as one of the first attempts by street organizations to broker a truce between groups of different ethnic backgrounds.

Peace treaty

After the death of "Black Benjie," a member of the Ghetto Brothers who turned community activist, a peace treaty meeting was organized among the South Bronx gangs. The gangs in attendance that are most frequently mentioned include the Black Spades, Ghetto Brothers, Savage Skulls, Turbans, and Seven Immortals. This historic treaty among South Bronx gangs lasted until the crack cocaine wars erupted during the early 1980s.

Gangs that attended the Hoe Avenue peace treaty meeting:

 Alley Cats
 Bachelors
 Black Cats Inc
 Black Ivory
 Black Pearls
 Black Spades
 Blue Imperials
 Born To Raise Hell 
 Brothers & Sisters (Offshoot Of Seven Immortals)
 Deserters
 Dirty Dozen R.T. (Offshoot Of Savage Skulls)
 Dominican Lions
 Evil Serpents (offshoot of Reapers Bronx)
 Flying Dutchmen 
 Flaming Lords 
 Fox St. Association
 Ghetto Brothers Org 
 Immortals New York
 Javelins
 Latin Aces 
 Latin Kings
 Liberated Panthers
 Mac.7 Rounds
 Majestic Warlocks Tribe (Offshoot Of The Seven Immortals 1st Div)
 Mongols (Offshoot Of Seven Immortals 1st Div)
 Peacemakers 1st D.V., 2nd D.V. 
 P.O.W.E.R.
 Renegades
 Roman Kings (Offshoot Of The Savage Nomads 3rd Div)
 Savage Sisters
 Royal Swords
 Savage Nomads - est. 1967 (Offshoot of Ghetto brothers)
 Savage Skulls- est. 1969 (Offshoot Of The Savage Nomads 1st Div)
 Seven Immortals- est.1971 (Offshoot Of The Savage Nomads 1st Div)
 Shades of Black (Offshoot Of Reapers Bronx)
 Slics
 Spanish Daggers
 Spanish Skulls 
 Turbans 1st D.V., 4th D.V., 5th D.V. 
 United Lords 
 Young Saigons
 Young Sinners

History
The meeting was held at the Boys Club on Hoe Avenue in the Bronx, with dozens of street organizations and many city officials and police present. Attendants included the Black Pearls, Savage Skulls, Turbans, Young Sinners, Royal Javelins, Dutchmen, Magnificent Seven, Dirty Dozens, Liberated Panthers, Black Spades, Seven Immortals, Latin Spades, Peacemakers, and Ghetto Brothers. The peace meeting was organized by the Ghetto Brothers after one of their members, 25-year-old Cornell "Black Benjie" Benjamin, was killed trying to stop a gang fight. The objective was to draw up a peace treaty in honor of "Black Benjie", who had been the designated peacemaker of the Ghetto Brothers.

To help ensure it would be nonviolent, it was arranged to have a member of the Turbans gang to take position, with a rifle, on a rooftop across the street from the Boys' Club on the day of the meeting. Inside, the power structure was in evidence. Presidents, vice-presidents, and warlords sat on folding chairs in a circle in the middle of the club's gymnasium. Gang members took seats in the bleachers, while wives were made to wait outside the building. Only two women were permitted inside—the presidents of the all-girl gangs, the Alley Cats and the Savage Sisters—and their folding chairs were placed in the last/fourth row, behind those of the warlords. 

The peace meeting appears in Flyin' Cut Sleeves, a documentary film by Rita Fecher and Henry Chalfant.

Spanish Eddie
One of the Youth Services Agency's Bronx gang crisis squad, 27-year-old Eduardo Vincenti, "Spanish Eddie" (a veteran of the 1950s Bronx street gangs), began working on the grandiose notion of getting every major gang in the Bronx to sign an intergang treaty and alliance. This giant alliance would be called "The Family", and every gang would become a division in the larger gang. The idea had just enough vision in it for gang leaders to be interested in its possibilities. Vincenti felt that once unified under a single name, the gangs could do virtually anything, if someone provided them with the right kind of social vision. The police admitted to the existence of as many as 10,000 gang members in the Bronx alone.

Vincenti signed on 68 gangs to the coalition/treaty before he and 10 other crisis squad members were suddenly transferred from the Bronx and reassigned to Brooklyn, where he was shot in the face trying to prevent a gun battle in the West Farms neighborhood. Vincenti survived to continue work on the Brotherhood Family in his spare time. Bronx Squad Crisis members believed the shooting was orchestrated in response to his attempts to broker a treaty.

40th anniversary
In 2011, former members of the Ghetto Brothers and Black Panthers spoke to the New York Daily News in advance of a planned commemoration scheduled to take place at the Bronx River Art Center at 305 East 140th Street. Joseph Mpa of the Black Panthers stated that the truce itself played a role in the rise of hip hop culture since it permitted greater ease of travel between neighborhoods without fear of reprisals for crossing gang boundaries.

See also
 
 Benjamin Melendez
 Watts Truce
 Rubble Kings - 2015 documentary that depicts events preceding and following the Hoe Avenue peace meeting

References

1971 conferences
Gangs in New York City
Street gangs
1971 in New York City
History of the Bronx
1970s in the Bronx